Beston Chambeshi (born 4 April 1960) is a Zambian football coach and former player.

Playing career
Chambeshi played club football for Nkana.

He represented Zambia at the 1988 Summer Olympics.

Coaching career
He coached Zambian club side Power Dynamos from 2012 to 2013. He became manager of the Zambian under-20 team in 2017, and managed them at the 2017 FIFA U-20 World Cup. He combined his role with that of club side Nkana, and he won the 2017 FAZ Coach of the Year Award.

In May 2018, following the resignation of Wedson Nyirenda, he was appointed interim manager of the Zambian senior team. He was replaced by Belgian manager Sven Vandenbroeck in July 2018.

In July 2021, Chambeshi was appointed manager of Zambia, replacing Milutin Sredojević.

References

External links
 
 

1960 births
Living people
Zambian footballers
Nkana F.C. players
Olympic footballers of Zambia
Footballers at the 1988 Summer Olympics
Zambian football managers
Zambia national football team managers
Association football forwards